The Soviet Union's 1955 nuclear test series was a group of 7 nuclear tests conducted in 1955. These tests followed the 1954 Soviet nuclear tests series and preceded the 1956 Soviet nuclear tests series.

References

1955
1955 in the Soviet Union
1955 in military history
Explosions in 1955